The Bogotá Museum of Modern Art (MAMBO) is a modern art museum located in Bogotá, Colombia. It was designed by architect Rogelio Salmona.

History
The Museum was founded by Gloria Zea, who died 11 March 2019, aged 83.

See also
Museum of Modern Art of Medellín

References

General references
https://www.semana.com/cultura/articulo/mambo-museo-de-arte-moderno-de-bogota-reabre-sus-puertas/518143

External links

Modern Art Museum of Bogotá (MAMBO), (official site, Spanish and English)

Museums in Bogotá
Art museums and galleries in Colombia
Modern art museums